J. Augustus Johnson (fl. 1870–1890) was American consul in Beirut. He was initially incorrectly inducted as G. Augustus Johnson.

Career
During his career, Johnson was instrumental in arranging the receipt by the Metropolitan Museum of Art of the first item they accessioned, a Roman marble sarcophagus with garlands, after J. Abdo Debbas, the American vice-consul at Tarsus, wrote to Johnson to offer the item to the U.S. government. Johnson replied that the government could not accept such a gift and the item was instead agreed to be presented to an American institution recommended by Johnson. After meeting John Taylor Johnston and other founders of the Metropolitan Museum of Art, it was agreed that the item should be received by them. Transit to the coast at Mersin was arranged by Debbas using a team of sixteen buffalo to pull the sarcophagus on a wagon. It then travelled by sea on the Shenandoah, arriving at the museum in late 1870.

References

American diplomats
19th-century American diplomats
Year of birth missing
Year of death missing